Amplified musculoskeletal pain syndromes are pain syndromes where excessive, acute and chronic pain are observed for which no overt primary cause can be found or surmised.

Amplified musculoskeletal pain syndromes include:

complex regional pain syndrome, Types I & II (formerly known as reflex sympathetic dystrophy (RSD) and Causalgia),
fibromyalgia,
diffuse idiopathic pain (also called diffuse amplified pain),
localized idiopathic pain (also called localized amplified pain),
neuropathic pain,
reflex neurovascular dystrophy

References

Chronic pain syndromes